General elections were held in Turkey on 29 November 1987. Prior to the elections, the military junta's restrictions on former politicians were lifted, allowing them to re-enter politics. Despite a reduction in its share of the vote, the Motherland Party retained its majority in parliament, gaining 81 seats. Voter turnout was 93.3%.

The elections saw the return of the religious oriented base of Necmettin Erbakan and the symbol names of the politics in the 1970s, Bülent Ecevit and Süleyman Demirel. Bülent Ecevit led the Democratic Left Party as the Republican People's Party was closed down after the coup of 1980. Süleyman Demirel founded the True Path Party to challenge the power of Turgut Özal on conservative liberal votes. The elections were marked by harsh restrictions on televised publicity for the opposition parties. Unlike the 1983 elections, there was no televised debate between the presidential candidates. Only one week before the elections, political infomercials from the different parties were aired. The Social Democratic Populist Party gained the most benefit of the infomercials, as the SHP polled about 30% compared to the 18% before screening the infomercial.

Background 
On 26 September 1985 a merger protocol was signed between the Populist Party (HP) and the Social Democracy Party (SODEP). As a result, both parties held extraordinary congresses and HP was renamed the Social Democratic Populist Party (SHP), while SODEP was dissolved and merged into the SHP. This united the left in a single party.

Results

References

General elections in Turkey
Turkey
Turkey
General
Turkey